The SSM-N-2 Triton was a supersonic nuclear land-attack cruise missile project for the United States Navy. It was in development from 1946 to 1957, but probably no prototypes were produced or tested. The Triton program was approved in September 1946, designated SSM-2 a year later, and redesignated SSM-N-2 in early 1948. A preliminary design was produced by 1950 as the XSSM-N-2, but was scaled down by 1955 and redesigned again in 1957. Triton was cancelled in 1957, probably as a result of the 1956 decision to focus the Navy's strategic weapons development on the Polaris submarine-launched ballistic missile. Regulus II was itself cancelled in 1958, although testing of missiles already built continued for several years.

Development history
Triton was approved by the US Navy in 1946 and a preliminary design was ready by 1950. The goal was to produce a supersonic land-attack nuclear cruise missile capable of being launched from the same platforms and equipment as the subsonic SSM-N-8 Regulus I, which were surface combatants, submarines, and aircraft carriers via launch rails or catapults. One reference cites Triton as an outgrowth of Operation Bumblebee, which produced the Navy's first production surface-to-air missiles, notably Talos, which had a ramjet sustainer like Triton.

An artist’s concept shows the first iteration of Triton with a long ramjet body, two mid-body stub wings, and four solid-fuel boosters clustered around a relatively large cruciform tail. Since Regulus I weighed under , it's difficult to see how this version of Triton would be usable by the initial Regulus platforms. Even Regulus II, which occupied about twice the volume of Regulus I, weighed only . This design was approved for further development, with initial operational capability expected by 1965. Triton was cancelled that same year in favor of Polaris, which proved to be a wildly successful system despite being produced on a "crash" timeline.

At a cost of $19.4 million in 1953 dollars, Triton was a somewhat expensive failure. However, in 1950 it could not be foreseen that the turbojet-powered, supersonic Regulus II would be comparable to a ramjet-powered weapon in just six years, or that a solid-fueled ballistic missile (Polaris) would soon eclipse all of the Navy’s other strategic options, and that it could be developed and deployed by 1961.

Possible platforms
Sketch designs were prepared for surface ships and submarines to carry Triton. A submarine capable of carrying four Triton or Regulus II missiles or up to eight Regulus I missiles was sketched in 1956. One of the many proposals for modernizing the Iowa-class battleships came in 1955, featuring Talos surface-to-air missiles (SAMs) and one or two launchers for Regulus or Triton. The incomplete  was proposed for completion to this design. Another incomplete ship, the large cruiser , was also proposed for various conversions, including a 1947 sketch with 12 launchers for copies of the V-2 short-range ballistic missile and six Triton launchers (though one reference states these launchers were for Operation Bumblebee's developmental XPM (Experimental Prototype Missile) SAM).

References

Bibliography
 
 
 
 
 SSM-N-2 Triton on Italian Wikipedia

Further reading
 
 
 
 

Nuclear cruise missiles of the United States
Nuclear cruise missiles of the United States Navy
Cruise missiles of the Cold War
Cold War nuclear missiles of the United States
Abandoned military rocket and missile projects of the United States